Listed below are the dates and results for the qualification to the 1978 FIFA World Cup rounds for the European zone (UEFA) in association football. For an overview of the qualification rounds, see the article 1978 FIFA World Cup qualification.

The European zone was allocated 9.5 places (out of 16) in the final tournament. West Germany, the defending champions, qualified automatically, leaving 8.5 spots open for competition between 31 teams. Albania were the only UEFA team to not enter the competition.

The 31 teams were divided into 9 groups of 3 or 4 teams each (five groups with 3 teams and four groups with 4 teams). The teams would play against each other on a home-and-away basis. The winners of groups 1 to 8 would qualify, the winner of group 9 would advance to the UEFA / CONMEBOL Intercontinental Play-off.

Summary
Below is a table containing all nine qualifying groups. Teams that qualified and secured a place in the final tournament are highlighted in green, while teams who were eliminated are highlighted in red. The team that secured a place in the UEFA / CONMEBOL Intercontinental Play-off is highlighted in blue. Teams are ordered by final group position.

Key:
Teams highlighted in green qualified for the finals.
Teams highlighted in blue advanced to the UEFA / CONMEBOL Intercontinental Play-off.

Groups

Group 1

Group 2

Group 3

Group 4

Group 5

Group 6

Group 7

Group 8

Group 9

Hungary advanced to the UEFA–CONMEBOL play-off.

Inter-confederation play-offs

Goalscorers

9 goals

 Roberto Bettega

7 goals

 Hans Krankl

5 goals

 Martin Hoffmann
 Cemil Turan

4 goals

 Joachim Streich
 Kevin Keegan
 Kazimierz Deyna
 Grzegorz Lato
 Manuel Fernandes
 Thomas Sjöberg

3 goals

 Mick Channon
 Michel Platini
 Tibor Nyilasi
 Francesco Graziani
 Ruud Geels
 Chris McGrath
 Safet Sušić

2 goals

 Josef Stering
 Raoul Lambert
 Pavel Panov
 Lars Bastrup
 Henning Munk Jensen
 Per Røntved
 Allan Simonsen
 Hartmut Schade
 Ray Kennedy
 Aki Heiskanen
 Esa Heiskanen
 Olavi Rissanen
 Mimis Papaioannou
 Zoltán Kereki
 András Törőcsik
 Giancarlo Antognoni
 Johan Cruyff
 Johnny Rep
 Gerry Armstrong
 Andrzej Szarmach
 Stanisław Terlecki
 Fernando Chalana
 Nené
 Dudu Georgescu
 Anghel Iordǎnescu
 Kenny Dalglish
 David Kipiani
 Rubén Cano
 Bo Börjesson
 Sedat Özden
 Leighton James

1 goal

 Roland Hattenberger
 Wilhelm Kreuz
 Hans Pirkner
 Herbert Prohaska
 Walter Schachner
 Paul Courant
 Maurice Martens
 Gilbert Van Binst
 François Van der Elst
 Roger Van Gool
 Hristo Bonev
 Chavdar Tsvetkov
 Andrey Zhelyazkov
 Takis Antoniou
 Stefanis Michael
 Stavros Stylianou
 Miroslav Gajdůšek
 Zdeněk Nehoda
 Antonín Panenka
 Ladislav Petráš
 Allan Hansen
 Jørgen Kristensen
 Benny Nielsen
 Kristen Nygaard
 Ole Rasmussen
 Niels Tune-Hansen
 Peter Kotte
 Wolfram Löwe
 Jürgen Sparwasser
 Gert Weber
 Trevor Brooking
 Trevor Francis
 Paul Mariner
 Stuart Pearson
 Joe Royle
 Dennis Tueart
 Kai Haaskivi
 Teppo Heikkinen
 Ari Mäkynen
 Jyrki Nieminen
 Matti Paatelainen
 Dominique Bathenay
 Christian Dalger
 Bernard Lacombe
 Dominique Rocheteau
 László Fazekas
 István Halász
 László Nagy
 Sándor Pintér
 László Pusztai
 Béla Várady
 Sándor Zombori
 Ingi Björn Albertsson
 Ásgeir Sigurvinsson
 Liam Brady
 Don Givens
 Romeo Benetti
 Franco Causio
 Claudio Gentile
 Renato Zaccarelli
 Nico Braun
 Gilbert Zender
 Ruud Krol
 Willem Van Hanegem
 René Van de Kerkhof
 Willy Van de Kerkhof
 Sammy McIlroy
 Derek Spence
 Odd Iversen
 Tom Lund
 Rune Ottesen
 Zbigniew Boniek
 Bohdan Masztaler
 Włodzimierz Mazur
 Rui Jordão
 Octávio Machado
 Seninho
 Francisco Vital
 László Bölöni
 Iosif Vigu
 Asa Hartford
 Joe Jordan
 Don Masson
 Leonid Burjak
 Anatoliy Konkov
 Eugenio Leal
 Pirri
 Björn Andersson
 Peter Risi
 Claudio Sulser
 Serge Trinchero
 Mehmet Özgül
 Volkan Yayim
 Nick Deacy
 Zoran Filipović
 Dražen Mužinić
 Aleksandar Trifunović

1 own goal

 László Bálint (playing against the Soviet Union)
 Gregorio Benito (playing against Romania)
 Ian Evans (playing against Scotland)

See also
1978 FIFA World Cup qualification
1978 FIFA World Cup qualification (CONMEBOL)
1978 FIFA World Cup qualification (CONCACAF)
1978 FIFA World Cup qualification (CAF)
1978 FIFA World Cup qualification (AFC and OFC)

References

 
UEFA
FIFA World Cup qualification (UEFA)
World Cup